This list covers the passenger railway stations and halts in the Saarland, a state in southwestern Germany, that are served by scheduled and/or museum services.

Description

The list is organised as follows:

 Name: current name of the station or halt.
 Urban/Rural county (‘’Kreis)’’: This column gives the county in which the station is located. The abbreviations used are given below and correspond to the standard abbreviations used on German car number plates. The counties in the Saarland are:
Merzig-Wadern (MZG)
Neunkirchen (NK)
Regionalverband Saarbrücken (SB und VK)
Saarlouis (SLS)
Saarpfalz (HOM und IGB)
St. Wendel (WND)
 Railway operator: All the stations in the Saarland are part of the Saarländischer Verkehrsverbund (saarVV).
 Cat: The Cat column shows the current category of the station as at  1 January 2013. This only applies however to DB Station&Service stations and excludes stations run by private operators like the Losheim Museum Railway Club (MECL).
 The next five columns show which types of train use the station. The individual abbreviations are based on those used by the DB AG but are applied equally to the equivalent services of other operators:
 ICE – InterCityExpress and TGV
 IC – Intercity and Eurocity
 RE – Regional-Express
 RB – Regionalbahn
 S – S-Bahn and Saarbahn
 Line – This column gives the railway line on which the station is situated. Only routes that are still operating over the section in which the station is found are named.
 Remarks – In this column additional information is provided, particularly with regard to railway operators and seasonal services.

Station overview

Notes

See also
German railway station categories
Railway station types of Germany
List of scheduled railway routes in Germany

External links 

 Online timetable of DB services
 Scheduled services in the Saarland (pdf file, 98.5 kB)

 
Saar 
Rail